The 2016 World RX of Belgium was the third round of the third season of the FIA World Rallycross Championship. The event was held at the Circuit Jules Tacheny Mettet in Mettet, Wallonia and also played host to the second round of the 2016 FIA European Rallycross Championship.

Supercar

Heats

Semi-finals
Semi-Final 1

Semi-Final 2

Final

RX Lites

Heats

Semi-finals
Semi-Final 1

Semi-Final 2

Final

Standings after the event

Supercar standings

RX Lites standings

 Note: Only the top five positions are included.

References

External links

|- style="text-align:center"
|width="35%"|Previous race:2016 World RX of Hockenheim
|width="40%"|FIA World Rallycross Championship2016 season
|width="35%"|Next race:2016 World RX of Great Britain
|- style="text-align:center"
|width="35%"|Previous race:2015 World RX of Belgium
|width="40%"|World RX of Belgium
|width="35%"|Next race:2017 World RX of Belgium
|- style="text-align:center"

Belgium
World RX
World RX